Carlos Mauricio Encinas Vásquez (born 26 December 1964) is a Chilean football manager who manages Lautaro de Buin.

Career

In 2016, Encinas was appointed manager of Chilean third tier side Melipilla, helping them earn promotion to the Chilean second tier. In 2020, he  was appointed manager of Lautaro de Buin in the Chilean third tier, helping them earn promotion to the Chilean second tier.

Personal life

He is the grandson of Chilean poet and writer Nicomedes Guzmán.

References

External links

 

1964 births
Chilean football managers
Chilean footballers
Deportes Melipilla managers
Living people
Primera B de Chile managers
Segunda División Profesional de Chile managers